Apocalypse: the Cold War, also known as Apocalypse: War of worlds (in French: Apocalypse, la guerre des mondes), is a TV series made up of 6 French documentaries which retraces the main events of the Cold War, from 1945 to 1991. Over 200 hours of unpublished archives have been restored and colorized to illustrate the period from the end of World War II until the fall of the USSR in 1991.

These documentaries were written and produced by Isabelle Clarke and Daniel Costelle, with the collaboration of Mickaël Gamrasni.

The series was originally broadcast in several countries on various French-language television channels. Also, the series was broadcast by National Geographic in several regions of the World.

Episodes

See also
 Apocalypse: The Second World War
 Apocalypse: Hitler
 Apocalypse: Stalin
 Apocalypse: Verdun
 Apocalypse: World War I
 Apocalypse: Never-Ending War 1918-1926

References

External links
 Information on IMDb
 Official website (in French)
 Information in TV5 Canada (in French)

French documentary television series
2019 French television series debuts
2019 French television series endings
Cold War
Documentary television series about the Cold War